Tyabb railway station is located on the Stony Point line in Victoria, Australia. It serves the town of Tyabb, and it opened on 10 September 1889.

History

Tyabb station opened on 10 September 1889, when the railway line from Baxter was extended to Hastings. Like the town itself, the station was named after an Indigenous word meaning 'waterholes' or 'mudhole'.

Signals were once provided at the station, however they were abolished in 1947.

In 1966, flashing light signals were provided at the Mornington–Tyabb Road level crossing, located nearby in the Down direction of the station.

On 22 June 1981, the passenger service between Frankston and Stony Point was withdrawn and replaced with a bus service. On 16 September 1984, promotional trips for the reopening of the line began and, on 27 September of that year, the passenger service was reinstated.

By May 1983, the station operated under no-one in charge conditions. Until February 1986, the station consisted of a waiting room, basic toilets and a ticket office. As part of a government rationalisation of public transport, these facilities were no longer deemed necessary, and the buildings were demolished and replaced with the current shelters.

In 2006, boom barriers were provided at the Mornington–Tyabb Road level crossing.

Platforms and services

Tyabb has one platform. It is serviced by Metro Trains' Stony Point line services.

Platform 1:
  all stations services to Frankston; all stations services to Stony Point

Transport links

Ventura Bus Lines operates two routes via Tyabb station, under contract to Public Transport Victoria:
 : Frankston station – Flinders
 : Frankston station – Hastings

References

External links
 Melway map at street-directory.com.au

Railway stations in Melbourne
Railway stations in Australia opened in 1889
Railway stations in the Shire of Mornington Peninsula